Human nature refers to the distinguishing characteristics, including ways of thinking, feeling and acting, that humans tend to have naturally.

Human nature may also refer to:

Arts, entertainment, and media

Literature
Human Nature (novel), a 1995 Doctor Who novel by Paul Cornell
Human Nature, notebooks of Donald Winnicott
A Treatise of Human Nature (1738), by Hume, sometimes abbreviated as "Hume's Human Nature"
On Human Nature, a book by Harvard biologist E. O. Wilson

Music
 Human Nature (band), an Australian vocal group formed in 1989

Albums
 Human Nature (America album), 1998
 Human Nature (Human Nature album), 2000
 Human Nature (Harem Scarem album), 2006
 Human Nature (Hardline album), 2016
 Human Nature (Herb Alpert album), 2016
 Human Nature, an upcoming album by Swae Lee
 Human. :II: Nature. by Nightwish, 2020

Songs
"Human Nature" (Michael Jackson song), 1982
"Human Nature" (Madonna song), 1995
"Human Nature" (Gary Clail On-U Sound System song), 1991
"Human Nature", a song by Sevdaliza from The Calling (2018) and Shabrang (2020)
"Human Nature", a song by Adema

Other arts, entertainment, and media 
 Human Nature (2001 film), a comedy-drama film starring Patricia Arquette, Rhys Ifans and Tim Robbins
Human Nature (2019 film), a documentary film
 "Human Nature" (Doctor Who), a 2007 Doctor Who episode by Paul Cornell based on the novel
 Human Nature (journal), an academic journal published by Springer Science+Business Media

Other uses
Chomsky–Foucault debate, on human nature